Juel is a Nordic surname.

Notable people with this surname include:
 Anne Juel, French-British physicist
 Celine Juel (born 1993), Danish badminton player
 Christian Juel (1855-1935), Danish mathematician
 Dagfin Juel (1909-1985), Norwegian politician
 Dagny Juel (1867-1901), Norwegian writer
 Donald Juel (1942-2003), American educator
 Erik Juel (1591-1657), Danish courtier
 Jacob Juel (1744-1800), Norwegian timber trader
 Jens Juel (disambiguation), several people
 Karin Juel (1900-1976), Swedish artist
 Inger Juel (1926–1979) Swedish actress
 Maren Juel (1749-1815), Norwegian landowner
 Niels Juel (1629-1697), Danish-Norwegian admiral
 Povel Juel (1673-1723), Norwegian civil servant and writer

References